Myristoleic acid, or 9-tetradecenoic acid, is an omega-5 fatty acid.  It is biosynthesized from myristic acid by the enzyme Stearoyl-CoA desaturase-1, but it is uncommon in nature.  One of the major sources of this fatty acid is the seed oil from plants of the family Myristicaceae, comprising up to 30 per cent of the oil in some species. It is a constituent of Serenoa or Saw palmetto, and appears to have activity against LNCaP prostate-cancer cells.

See also
 Cetyl myristoleate

References

Fatty acids
Alkenoic acids